Rachid Talbi Alami (born 1958, Tetouan) is a Moroccan politician of the National Rally of Independents party who is the President (Speaker) of the House of Representatives of Morocco since October 9th, 2021. He was elected representative of Tetouan in the 2021 Moroccan general election.

Political career 
In 2001, during the third National Congress of the National Rally of Independents (RNI), Rachid Talbi Alami was elected member of the central commission of the party.

He was Minister of Trade, Industry and Telecommunication in the cabinet of Driss Jettou from 7 November 2002 to 8 June 2004, and Minister Delegate to the Prime Minister in charge of Economic and General Affairs in the same cabinet, from June 2004 to October 2007.

Reelected Chairman of the Urban Municipality of Tetouan in 2003.

In September 2009, he was elected Chairman of the Tangier-Tetouan Regional Council and reelected Chairman of the same Council in October 2012.

Chairperson of the African Parliamentary Union (APU), on 2 November 2014.

He was the Speaker of the House of Representatives from April 2014 to October 2016.

Rachid Talbi Alami was Minister of Youth and Sports, from 5 April 2017 to 9 October 2019.

Life and education 
Rachid Talbi El Alami studied at the Mohammed V University in Rabat and obtained a PhD in finance and management from the New York University in the United States.

He also held the position of international expert in decentralization and local finance systems at the United States Agency for International Development USAID.

See also
House of representatives, Morocco
Morocco parliament
Cabinet of Morocco

References

Government ministers of Morocco
1958 births
Living people
People from Tétouan
Presidents of the House of Representatives (Morocco)
Moroccan economists
Mohammed V University alumni
Mayors of places in Morocco
National Rally of Independents politicians